Venturada is a municipality of the Community of Madrid, Spain.

Public transport  
Venturada has several bus lines, most of them connect the municipality with Madrid. This lines are: 

191: Madrid - Buitrago

193: Madrid - Pedrezuela - El Vellón

193A: El Molar - Cotos de Monterrey - Venturada

194: Madrid - Rascafría

195: Madrid - Braojos de la Sierra

196: Madrid - La Acebeda

197C: Torrelaguna - Venturada - Cabanillas

N104 (night service): Madrid - San Agustín de Guadalix - Pedrezuela - Venturada

References 

 
Municipalities in the Community of Madrid